Natham palayam is a small village. Located in Kanakkam palayam panjayat, Tirupur taluk, Coimbatore district, Tamil Nadu, India.

Villages in Tiruppur district